Heterocrossa literata is a moth of the Carposinidae family first described by Alfred Philpott in 1930. It is endemic to New Zealand.

References

 

Carposinidae
Moths of New Zealand
Moths described in 1930
Endemic fauna of New Zealand
Taxa named by Alfred Philpott
Endemic moths of New Zealand